April O'Neil (born April 7, 1987) is an American pornographic actress.

Originally from Phoenix, Arizona, O'Neil started her pornographic film career in 2008 after moving to Los Angeles and meeting another actress at a party. She adopted her stage name in homage to April O'Neil, one of the primary characters in Teenage Mutant Ninja Turtles. In 2013, she was one of the sixteen actresses profiled in Deborah Anderson's documentary film Aroused. She identifies as bisexual. LA Weekly ranked her tenth on their list of "10 Innovative Porn Stars Who Could Be the Next Sasha Grey" in 2013.

Her moniker helped brand her as a "hipster porn star" according to LA Weekly. A favorite of nerds, she regularly directs and performs in pornographic parodies of pop culture and gaming such as Riverdale, The Lego Movie, and Fortnite.

O’Neil initially used her Tumblr account in 2008 to mostly post Doctor Who memes and later transitioned into posting her nude work. She believed her notoriety stemmed from these posts. When Tumblr began censoring their accounts for adult content, she had an established performing career and moved onto other platforms.

O'Neil is an avid pinball player, regularly competing in a league at a Los Angeles arcade.

Awards and nominations

References

External links

 
 
 
 

1987 births
Actresses from Phoenix, Arizona
American pornographic film actresses
Bisexual pornographic film actresses
LGBT people from Arizona
Living people
People from Phoenix, Arizona
Pornographic film actors from Arizona
21st-century LGBT people
21st-century American actresses